Leslie Brody (born 1952) is an American author. Born in the Bronx and brought up on Long Island, Brody went to grade school in Riverhead, New York and high school in Massapequa, New York.  At 17 years old, she left home to become an underground press reporter for the Berkeley Tribe. A year later, she set off to travel around Europe. From 1971 to 1976, Brody lived in London and Amsterdam, sampling various hippie occupations. She returned to California in the late 1970s and worked as a librarian both at the San Francisco College of Mortuary Science, and for the Sierra Club, while attending college at San Francisco State University.

While in San Francisco, Brody became involved in theatre and playwriting, and became a resident playwright of the One-Act Theatre Company of San Francisco. She was offered a fellowship at The Playwrights' Center and moved to Minneapolis. While there, she worked for the Hungry Mind Review as a columnist and contributing editor.

In 1993, she returned to college, this time at the University of Connecticut, Storrs, earning her PhD in English. Brody undertook various fellowships and assistantships and became part of UCONN's English department from 1994 to 1998. Ever since, Brody has been a professor of English and Creative Writing at The University of Redlands, primarily teaching non-fiction writing workshops in addition to seminars in documentary film, literary journalism and monologue writing for the stage.

Leslie Brody has been married to the writer Gary Amdahl since 1989.

Books
 1998 — Red Star Sister: Between Madness and Utopia (St. Paul, Minnesota: Hungry Mind Press) 
 2001 — A Motel of the Mind Written with Gary Amdahl (Santa Rosa, California: Philos Press) 
 2010 — Irrepressible: The Life and Times of Jessica Mitford, (Berkeley, California : Counterpoint Press) 
2020 — Sometimes You Have to Lie: The Life and Times of Louise Fitzhugh, Renegade Author of Harriet the Spy, (Califorinia: Seal Press)

References

External links
 Leslie's Blog
 Miss Leslie's Magazine
 Interview with Leslie from Counter Point
 Interview with Brody on "New Books in Biography"
 C-SPAN Book Discussion on Irrepressible
 Leslie Brody as Featured Author
 "Two Minutes with Jessica Mitford" video

Reviews
 Review of Irrepressible: The Life and Times of Jessica Mitford by Steve Weinberg in San Francisco Chronicle
 Review of Irrepressible: The Life and Times of Jessica Mitford by Anne Chisholm on The Spectator
 Review of Irrepressible: The Life and Times of Jessica Mitford by Jessica Ferri on BookForum

1952 births
Living people
American women writers
Writers from California
University of Redlands faculty
San Francisco State University alumni
University of Connecticut alumni
People from the Bronx
Women biographers
People from Riverhead (town), New York
People from Massapequa, New York
American women academics
21st-century American women